List of Guggenheim Fellowships awarded in 2002.

U.S. and Canadian Fellows

 Andrew Abbott, Gustavus F. and Ann M. Swift Distinguished Service Professor, University of Chicago: Time and social structure.
 Peter A. Abrams, Professor of Zoology, University of Toronto: Sources of uncertainty in ecological predictions.
 Betty Adcock, poet, Raleigh, North Carolina; Member of the MFA Faculty in Writing, Warren Wilson College MFA Program for Writers; Writer-in-Residence, Meredith College: Poetry.
 Rabih Alameddine, writer, San Francisco: Fiction.
 Robert Livingston Aldridge, composer, Clifton, New Jersey; Assistant Professor of Music, Montclair State University: Music composition.
 Elizabeth Alexander, poet, New Haven, Connecticut; Adjunct Associate Professor of African-American Studies, Yale University: Poetry.
 Philip B. Allen, Professor of Physics and Astronomy, State University of New York at Stony Brook: Electron-phonon effects in nanosystems.
 Thomas T. Allsen, Professor of History, College of New Jersey: The royal hunt in Eurasian history.
 Stephen Alter, writer, Reading, Massachusetts; Writer-in-Residence, Massachusetts Institute of Technology: A biography of the Indian elephant.
 Donald Antrim, writer, Brooklyn, New York: Fiction.
 Brett Baker, artist, Ithaca, New York: Painting.
 Rebecca Baron, film maker, Los Angeles; Member of the Faculty in Film, California Institute of the Arts: Film making.
 Lawrence W. Barsalou, Professor of Psychology, Emory University: The human conceptual system.
 Omer Bartov, John P. Birkelund Distinguished Professor of European History, Professor of History, and Professor of German Studies, Brown University: The origins of the Holocaust in Buczacz, Ukraine.
 Ellen B. Basso, Professor of Anthropology, University of Arizona: A translation of Kalapalo narratives.
 Louise Beach, composer, Pleasantville, New York: Music composition.
 Marion Belanger, photographer, Guilford, Connecticut: Photography.
 David A. Bell, Professor of History, Johns Hopkins University: The culture of war in the age of Napoleon.
 Paul Berman, writer, Brooklyn, New York: A study of pro-Americanism and anti-Americanism.
 George F. Bertsch, Professor of Physics, University of Washington, Seattle: The density functional theory of nuclear binding.
 Alan Bewell, Professor of English, University of Toronto: Romanticism and natural history.
 Dawoud Bey, photographer, Chicago. Professor of Photography, Columbia College Chicago: Photography.
 Stanley Boorman, Professor of Music, New York University: Music printing and publishing in Italy, 1501-1539.
 Philip Brett, Professor of Musicology, University of California, Los Angeles: The music and life of Benjamin Britten.
 Nicholas Brooke, composer, Kingston, New Jersey: Music composition.
 Diane Coburn Bruning, choreographer, Sleepy Hollow, New York; Artistic Director, Chamber Dance Project: Choreography.
 Mary Baine Campbell, Professor of English and American Literature, Brandeis University: Dream and metaphor in early modern literature, science, and personal life.
 Christopher Cannon, University Lecturer and Fellow, Faculty of English and Pembroke College, University of Cambridge: Form as thought in early Middle English literature.
 Bridget Carpenter, playwright, Los Angeles: Play writing.
 Noël E. Carroll, Monroe C. Beardsley Professor of the Philosophy of Art, University of Wisconsin–Madison: The philosophy of dance.
 Elinor Carucci, photographer, New York City; Member of the Faculty in Photography, School of Visual Arts: Photography.
 Rita Charon, Professor of Clinical Medicine and Director, Program in Narrative Medicine, College of Physicians and Surgeons, Columbia University: Narrative medicine as a model for empathy and clinical courage.
 Brian R. Cheffins, S. J. Berwin Professor of Corporate Law, University of Cambridge: The foundations of the Anglo-American corporate economy.
 Gang Chen, Associate Professor of Mechanical Engineering, Massachusetts Institute of Technology: Functional nanomechanical structures and devices.
 John R. Clarke, Annie Laurie Howard Regents Professor, University of Texas at Austin: Humor, power, and transgression in ancient Roman visual culture.
 Peter Cole, poet and translator, Jerusalem; Visiting Artist and Scholar, Jewish Studies Program, Wesleyan University: A translation of Hebrew poetry of Spain.
 Dennis Congdon, artist, Rehoboth, Massachusetts; Professor of Painting, Rhode Island School of Design: Painting.
 Anthony Cutler, Research Professor of Art History, Pennsylvania State University: Gifts and gift exchange between Byzantium, the Islamic world, and beyond.
 Lennard J. Davis, Professor of English, Professor of Disability and Human Development, University of Illinois at Chicago: A history of obsession in Western culture.
 Sam Davis, Professor of Architecture and Associate Dean, College of Environmental Design, University of California, Berkeley: Architecture for the homeless in America.
 John Dorst, Professor of American Studies, University of Wyoming: Animal trophies and taxidermy displays in contemporary American culture.
 Dennis Eberhard, Composer, Cleveland, Ohio; Director of Transitional Education Services, Services for Independent Living, Cleveland: Music composition.
 Judith Eisler, artist, New York City: Painting.
 Mitch Epstein, photographer, New York City; President, Black River Productions; Associate Professor of Photography, Bard College: Photography.
 Rodney C. Ewing, Professor of Nuclear Engineering and Radiological Sciences, Geological Sciences, and Materials Science and Engineering, University of Michigan: The impact of the nuclear fuel cycle on the environment.
 Ann Fabian, Associate Professor of American Studies and History, Rutgers University: The collection and display of human remains in 19th-century United States.
 Anne Feldhaus, Professor of Religious Studies, Arizona State University: Divine siblings in India.
 Robin Fleming, Professor of History, Boston College: Material culture and the rewriting of Anglo-Saxon history.
 Robert Fourer, Professor of Industrial Engineering and Management Sciences, Northwestern University: Languages and systems for large-scale optimization.
 William L. Fox, independent scholar, Portland, Oregon: The perception of space in Antarctica.
 Daniel S. Freed, Professor of Mathematics, University of Texas at Austin: Applications of K-theory to geometry and physics.
 Takashi Fujitani, Associate Professor of History, University of California, San Diego: "Korean Japanese" and "Japanese Americans" during World War II.
 Michael Gagarin, James R. Dougherty, Jr. Centennial Professor of Classics, University of Texas at Austin: Writing and orality in ancient Greek law.
 Mary Gaitskill, writer, Rhinebeck, New York; Instructor in English, Syracuse University: Fiction.
 Susan Gal, Professor of Anthropology and Linguistics, University of Chicago: Language ideologies and political authority during and after socialism.
 Thomas M. Gardner, Professor of English, Virginia Polytechnic Institute and State University: Emily Dickinson and contemporary writers.
 William Gay, writer, Hohenwald, Tennessee: Fiction.
 Diane Yvonne Ghirardo, Professor of the History and Theory of Architecture, University of Southern California and University of Cape Town: Women's spaces in Renaissance Ferrara.
 David D. Gilmore, Professor of Anthropology, State University of New York at Stony Brook: Monsters in rituals.
 Alfredo Gisholt, artist, Newton, Massachusetts; Teaching Associate of Art, Boston University: Painting.
 Susan Goodman, Professor of English, University of Delaware: A biography of William Dean Howells.
 Jeffrey L. Gould, Professor of History and Director, Center for Latin American and Caribbean Studies, Indiana University Bloomington: Rebellion, repression, and memory in El Salvador.
 David Greenspan, playwright, New York City: Play writing.
 Daniel Hall, poet, Amherst, Massachusetts; Visiting Writer, Amherst College: Poetry.
 Paul Harold Halpern, Professor of Mathematics and Physics, University of the Sciences in Philadelphia: The concept of dimensionality in science.
 Jonathan Hay, Associate Professor of Fine Arts, New York University: The erotics of luxury in Chinese art, 1580-1840.
 Perry Hoberman, artist, Brooklyn, New York; Member of the MFA Adjunct Faculty in Computer Art and Photography and Related Media, School of Visual Arts: New media art.
 Stephen D. Houston, Jesse Knight University Professor, Brigham Young University: Experience and being among the classic Maya.
 Nicholas Howe, Professor of English and Director, Center for Medieval and Renaissance Studies. Ohio State University: Cultural geography of Anglo-Saxon England.
 Martha C. Howell, Gustave Berne Professor of History, Columbia University: Market culture in cities of the late medieval North.
 John P. Huelsenbeck, Assistant Professor of Biology, University of Rochester: Studies in phylogenetic inference.
 David Humphrey, artist, New York City: Painting.
 Dan Hurlin, choreographer and theatre artist, New York City; Member of the Faculty in Dance and Theatre, Sarah Lawrence College: Choreography.
 Douglas A. Irwin, Professor of Economics, Dartmouth College: A history of United States trade policy.
 Kenro Izu, photographer, Rhinebeck, New York; President, Kenro Izu Studio: Photography.
 Richard Jackson, poet, Chattanooga, Tennessee; Professor of English, University of Tennessee, Chattanooga; Member of the Faculty, MFA Program in Writing, Vermont College: Poetry.
 Lea Jacobs, Professor of Communication Arts, University of Wisconsin–Madison: The decline of sentiment in American silent film.
 Iván A. Jaksic, Professor of History, University of Notre Dame: Ticknor, Prescott, and the origins of Hispanic studies in the United States.
 Deborah Jowitt, Senior Dance Critic, Village Voice; Master Teacher of Dance and Dance History, Tisch School of the Arts, New York University: A critical biography of Jerome Robbins.
 Mercouri G. Kanatzidis, Professor of Chemistry, Michigan State University: Studies in solid-state chemistry.
 Moisés Kaufman, playwright, New York City; Artistic Director, Tectonic Theatre Project: Play writing.
 Alexander S. Kechris, Professor of Mathematics, California Institute of Technology: Classification problems in mathematics, group actions, and equivalence relations.
 John Kelsay, Richard L. Rubenstein Professor of Religion, Florida State University: The Islamic law of war and peace.
 Stephen Kern, Distinguished Research Professor of History, Northern Illinois University: A cultural history of causality since 1830.
 Barbara J. King, Associate Professor of Anthropology and University Professor for Teaching Excellence, College of William and Mary: The social emergence of communication and language in primates.
 Elizabeth King, artist, Richmond, Virginia; School of the Arts Research Professor in Sculpture, Virginia Commonwealth University: Video Installation.
 Carol L. Krumhansl, Professor of Psychology, Cornell University: Cognitive neuroscience of music.
 Paul LaFarge, writer, Brooklyn, New York; Adjunct Professor of Writing, Columbia University; Visiting Writer, Wesleyan University: Fiction.
 Jhumpa Lahiri, writer, Brooklyn, New York: Fiction.
 Peter Lake, Professor of History, Princeton University: Dynastic crises, confessional politics, and conspiracy theory in post-Reformation England.
 Bun-Ching Lam, composer, Poestenkill, New York: Music composition.
 David W. Lea, Professor of Geological Sciences, University of California, Santa Barbara: The role of tropical ocean cooling and atmospheric carbon-dioxide variations in ice-age cycles.
 Marsha I. Lester, Professor of Chemistry, University of Pennsylvania: Significant radical reactions in the lower atmosphere.
 Arthur Levering, II, composer, Cambridge, Massachusetts: Music composition.
 Margaret Levi, Jere L. Bacharach Professor of International Studies and Professor of Political Science, University of Washington, Seattle: Trustworthy governance and constituent engagement.
 Laura A. Lewis, Associate Professor of Anthropology, James Madison University: Narratives of history, race, and place in the making of black Mexico.
 Xinsheng Sean Ling, Professor of Physics, Brown University: Studies in nanopore DNA sequencing.
 Kefeng Liu, Associate Professor of Mathematics, University of California, Los Angeles: Mathematical and physical aspects of the mirror principle.
 Rosemary Helen Lloyd, Rudy Professor of French, Indiana University Bloomington: The still life in art and letters.
 Andrew W. Lo, Harris & Harris Group Professor and Director, MIT Laboratory for Financial Engineering, Massachusetts Institute of Technology: A cognitive map of financial risk perception and preferences.
 Victor Lodato, playwright, Tucson, Arizona: Play writing.
 Abraham Loeb, Professor of Astronomy, Harvard University: Studies of the earliest stars and black holes.
 Jerome Loving, Professor of English, Texas A&M University: A biography of Theodore Dreiser.
 Michael Lucey, Associate Professor of French and Comparative Literature and Director, Center for the Study of Sexual Culture, University of California, Berkeley: Same-sex sexualities in 20th-century French literature.
 David Ludden, Professor of History, University of Pennsylvania: A history of knowledge about South Asian economies, 1770-1930.
 Philip Lutgendorf, Associate Professor of Hindi and Modern Indian Studies, University of Iowa: The meanings of the divine monkey in India.
 John D. Lyons, Commonwealth Professor of French, University of Virginia: The practice of imagination in early modern France.
 Mikhail Lyubich, Professor of Mathematics and Deputy Director, Institute for Mathematical Sciences, State University of New York at Stony Brook: Geometric structures in holomorphic dynamics.
 Kristin Mann, Associate Professor of History, Emory University: Trade, state, and emancipation in 19th-century Lagos.
 Lev Manovich, Associate Professor of New Media Art, University of California, San Diego: The avant-garde art of the early 20th century and new media culture.
 Tanya Marcuse, photographer, Barrytown, New York; Adjunct Professor of Photography, Simon's Rock College of Bard and Bard College: Photography.
 Robert L. Martensen, Professor of History of Medicine and Director, Clendending Library of History of Medicine, University of Kansas School of Medicine: The origins and cultural politics of the cerebral body.
 Chris Martin, artist, Brooklyn, New York; Art Therapist, Rivington House Health Care Facility, New York: Painting.
 Rita McBride, artist, New York City: Sculpture.
 Marlene McCarty, installation artist, New York City: Installation art.
 Jim McKay, film maker, New York City: Film making.
 Jane Mead, poet, Winston-Salem, North Carolina; Poet-in-Residence, Wake Forest University: Poetry.
 Ian A. Meinertzhagen, Killam Professor in Neuroscience, Dalhousie University: Post-genomic approaches to simple nervous systems.
 Claire Messud, Writer, Northampton, Massachusetts; Visiting Writer, Amherst College: Fiction.
 Guy P. R. Métraux, Professor of Visual Arts, York University: Christian destruction of ancient art.
 Susan Mogul, video and film maker, Los Angeles: Video and film making.
 Santi Moix, artist, New York City: Painting.
 Ian Morris, Jean and Rebecca Willard Professor of Classics and Professor of History, Stanford University: Greek democracy and standards of living in the first millennium BCE.
 Judith Murray, artist, New York City: Painting.
 John Nathan, Takashima Professor of Japanese Cultural Studies, University of California, Santa Barbara: Japan's quest for a viable role today.
 Stephen Neale, Professor of Philosophy, Rutgers University: Myths of meaning.
 Bruce Nelson, Professor of History, Dartmouth College: "Race" and "nation" in Ireland and the Irish diaspora.
 Eric Nisenson, writer, Malden, Massachusetts: The Brazilian musical and cultural revolution.
 Jennifer Nuss, artist, New York City; Artist-in-Residence, Brandeis University: Painting.
 Lena Cowen Orlin, Professor of English, University of Maryland, Baltimore County; Executive Director, Shakespeare Association of America: Privacy in early modern England.
 Kathy Peiss, Professor of History, University of Pennsylvania: Taste and the myth of American classlessness.
 H. Vincent Poor, Professor of Electrical Engineering, Princeton University: Quantum multi-user communications.
 René Prieto, Professor of Spanish, Vanderbilt University: The theme of solitude in Spanish American literature.
 Stephen Prina, artist, Los Angeles; Instructor in Fine Art, Art Center College of Design: Visual art.
 Pola Rapaport, film maker, Hampton Bays, New York: Film making.
 Dewey Redman, composer, Brooklyn, New York: Music composition.
 Donald Reid, Professor of History, University of North Carolina at Chapel Hill: A biography of Daniel Guérin.
 Howard Rosenthal, Roger Williams Straus Professor of Social Sciences and Professor of Politics, Princeton University: Empirical tests of theories of the legislative process.
 Jonathan L. Rosner, Professor of Physics, Enrico Fermi Institute, University of Chicago: Studies in heavy quark physics.
 Alexander Ross, artist, Alford, Massachusetts: Painting.
 Mary Ruefle, poet, Amherst, Massachusetts; Visiting Associate Professor of English, University of Alabama: Poetry.
 Russell Rymer, writer, Portland, Oregon: The pernambuco tree, conservation, and classical music.
 Richard A. Satterlie, Professor of Biology, Arizona State University: The modular and multifunctional nature of arousal systems.
 Adrian Saxe, Artist, Los Angeles; Professor of Art, University of California, Los Angeles: Sculpture.
 Ilya R. Segal, Associate Professor of Economics, Stanford University: Prior knowledge and communication constraints in the design of multi-unit auctions.
 Ullica Segerstråle, Professor of Sociology, Illinois Institute of Technology: An intellectual biography of the evolutionist William D. Hamilton.
 Ruth G. Shaw, Professor of Ecology, Evolution and Behavior, University of Minnesota: Evolutionary consequences of fragmentation.
 Charlie Smith, writer, New York City: Poetry.
 Sheila M. Sofian, film animator, Pasadena, California; Assistant Professor of Film Animation, College of the Canyons: Film animation.
 Pierre Sokolsky, Professor of Physics, University of Utah: Ultrahigh-energy cosmic rays on the ground and in space.
 David Stark, Arnold A. Saltzman Professor of Sociology & International Affairs, Columbia University: Network properties of East European capitalism.
 Allyson Strafella, artist, Brooklyn, New York: Drawing.
 Elisabeth Subrin, film maker, Brooklyn, New York; Visiting Lecturer of Film Studies, Amherst College: Film making.
 Lawrence R. Sulak, David M. Myers Distinguished Professor of Physics, Boston University: The observation of high-energy neutrinos.
 Madoka Takagi, photographer, Topanga, California: Photography.
 Gary Taylor, Professor of English and Director, Hudson Strode Program in Renaissance Studies, University of Alabama: The publishing career of Edward Blount.
 Richard Taylor, Professor of Mathematics, Harvard University: Galois representations and modular forms.
 Richard Lowe Teitelbaum, composer, Bearsville, New York; Professor of Music, Milton Avery Graduate School of the Arts, Bard College: Music composition.
 Elizabeth A. Thompson, Professor of Statistics and Biostatistics and Adjunct Professor of Genetics, University of Washington, Seattle: Studies in statistical genetics.
 Daniel Treisman, Associate Professor of Political Science, University of California, Los Angeles: Decentralization, governance, and economic performance.
 Matthew Turner, Associate Professor of Geography, University of Wisconsin–Madison: The history of environmental scientific practice in the Sahel.
 Naomi Uman, film maker, Newhall, California; Member of the Adjunct Faculty, California Institute of the Arts: Film making.
 Tomas Vu-Daniel, Artist, New York City; Assistant Professor of Art, Columbia University: Painting.
 Howard Waitzkin, Professor of Family and Community Medicine, Internal Medicine, and Sociology, University of New Mexico: Economic globalization and public health.
 Craig Walsh (Craig T. Walsh), composer, Tucson, Arizona; Associate Professor Emeritus of Music, University of Arizona: Music composition.
 Lee Palmer Wandel, Professor of History and Religious Studies, University of Wisconsin–Madison: The Eucharist in the early modern world.
 Robert N. Watson, Professor of English, University of California, Los Angeles: Human alienation from nature in the English Renaissance.
 Sheldon Weinbaum, CUNY Distinguished Professor of Mechanical and Biomedical Engineering, City College of New York: The structure and function of the endothelial glycocalyx.
 Jonathan Weinberg, independent scholar and artist, Jersey City: Art and identity in the East Village.
 Catherine Weis, choreographer, New York City; Artistic Director, Cathy Weis Projects; President and Co-Director, Roxanne Dance Foundation: Choreography.
 Claire Grace Williams, Professor of Genetics and Forestry, Texas A&M University: Ecological, evolutionary, and population genomics of conifers.
 Reggie Wilson, choreographer, Brooklyn, New York; Artistic Director, Reggie Wilson/Fist and Heel Performance Group: Choreography.
 Alison Winter, Associate Professor of History, University of Chicago: Technologies of truth and sciences of memory since 1890.
 Larry Wolff, Professor of History, Boston College: Legitimation and imagination in Habsburg Poland.
 Christopher S. Wood, Professor of History of Art, Yale University: Reproductive technologies and Renaissance art.
 James Woolley, Frank Lee and Edna M. Smith Professor of English, Lafayette College: The textual history of Jonathan Swift's poems.
 Randy Wray, artist, Brooklyn, New York: Painting and sculpture.
 Victoria Wulff, artist, New York City: Painting.
 Yu Xie, Frederick G. L. Huetwell Professor of Sociology and Statistics and Senior Research Scientist, Institute for Social Research, University of Michigan: Economic reform and social inequality in contemporary China.
 Karen Yasinsky, artist, Brooklyn, New York: Video.
 Charles F. Yocum, Alfred S. Sussman Collegiate Professor of Molecular, Cellular and Developmental Biology and Professor of Chemistry, University of Michigan: The role of calcium in photosynthetic oxygen production.
 Dean Young, Poet, Berkeley California; Visiting Professor, Writers' Workshop, University of Iowa; Member of the MFA Faculty in Writing, Warren Wilson College: Poetry.
 Carl Zimmer, writer, Sunnyside, New York: The discovery of the brain and the birth of the neurocentric age.
 Karl Zimmerer, Professor of Geography and Director, Environment and Development Research Institute, University of Wisconsin–Madison: The rural-urban geography of conservation and resource management.

Latin American and Caribbean Fellows
 Ana Victoria Arias Mantilla, video artist, Bogotá, Colombia: Video making.
 Eduardo M. Basualdo, independent researcher, National Research Council of Argentina (CONICET); Coordinator of Economics and Technology, Latin American Faculty of Social Sciences (FLACSO), Buenos Aires: The evolution, characteristics, and impact of Argentine external debt between 1970 and 2000.
 Mario Bellatin, writer, Mexico City: Fiction.
 José Bengoa, Professor of Anthropology, Universidad Academia de Humanismo Cristiano, Santiago, Chile: History of Mapuche society in the 16th and 17th centuries.
 Pablo Cabado, photographer, Buenos Aires: Photography.
 Jorge José Casal, Associate Professor of Agronomy, University of Buenos Aires; Research Scientist, National Research Council of Argentina (CONICET): Light signaling circuitry in Arabidopsis.
 Richard Cooke, staff scientist, Smithsonian Tropical Research Institute, Balboa, Panama: Life and death at a Precolumbian settlement in Panama.
 Alonso Cueto Caballero, writer, Lima, Peru: Fiction.
 Olívia Maria Gomes da Cunha, Associate Professor of Cultural Anthropology, Federal University of Rio de Janeiro: Ruth Landes in Brazil.
 Mauricio de Mello Dias, artist, Rio de Janeiro: Collaborative interdisciplinary public art (in collaboration with Walter Stephen Riedweg).
 Sandra M. Diaz, Independent Researcher, National Research Council of Argentina (CONICET); Associate Professor of Plant Biology, National University of Córdoba: Comparison of functional diversity and key traits in island and continental floras.
 George A. DosReis, Professor of Immunology, Federal University of Rio de Janeiro: Neutrophil clearance in defense against parasite infection.
 María Teresa Dova, Professor of Physics, National University of La Plata; Research Scientist, National Research Council of Argentina (CONICET): Cosmic rays and high energy experimental physics.
 Antonio Escobar Ohmstede, Research Professor and Director, Archival History of Water Project, Center for Research and Higher Studies in Social Anthropology (CIESAS), Mexico City: Huastecan pueblos, 1750-1856.
 Mario García Joya, cinematographer, Pasadena, California: The management and development of cinema in Cuba, 1960-2000.
 Diego Garcia Lambas, Professor of Astronomy, National University of Córdoba; Independent Researcher, National Research Council of Argentina (CONICET): Large-scale structure of the universe.
 Alicia Genovese, poet, Buenos Aires; Associate Professor of Literature, Kennedy University, Buenos Aires: Poetry.
 Andrea Giunta, Associate Professor of Art History, University of Buenos Aires; Associate Researcher, National Research Council of Argentina (CONICET): The problem of the representation of violence in art.
 Henry Eric Hernández García, artist, Havana, Cuba: Art interventions.
 Rafael Herrera, Visiting Assistant Professor of Mathematics, University of California, Riverside: Classification problems in Riemannian geometry of manifolds with special structures.
 Roberto Jacoby, artist, Buenos Aires; Executive Director, Fundacion Sociedad Tecnologia Arte (START), Buenos Aires: Networking interdisciplinary public art.
 Diana Jerusalinsky, Associate Professor of Biology, University of Buenos Aires; Independent Researcher, National Research Council of Argentina (CONICET): In vivo gene transfer to the hippocampus with herpes simplex derived vectors.
 Rafael Linden, Professor of Neuroscience, Institute of Biophysics, Federal University of Rio de Janeiro: Mechanisms of modulation of retinal cell death.
 Marcos Magalhães, film maker, Rio de Janeiro: Film animation.
 María Emma Mannarelli, Assistant Professor of History and Director, Gender Studies Program, Universidad Nacional Mayor de San Marcos, Lima: Writing, sexuality, and the process of secularization in Peru, 1895-1930.
 Carmen McEvoy, Associate Professor of History, University of the South: War and the national imagination in Chile, 1869-1884.
 María Moreno, writer, Buenos Aires; Editor, "Supplemento Las 12", Pagina 12, Buenos Aires: The Left, society, and sexuality in Argentine political culture.
 Paulo A. S. Mourao, Professor of Biochemistry, Federal University of Rio de Janeiro: New anticoagulant polysaccharides from marine invertebrates.
 Delfina Muschietti, poet, Buenos Aires, Argentina; Professor of Theory and Literary Analysis, University of Buenos Aires: Poetry.
 Mariano Narodowski, Professor of Education, National University of Quilmes, Buenos Aires: A theoretical model of the modes of education provision.
 Federico Neiburg, Professor of Social Anthropology, National Museum, Federal University of Rio de Janeiro: The social construction of a culture of economics in Argentina, 1950-2000.
 Hermann M. Niemeyer, Professor of Chemical Ecology, University of Chile: Chemoecological studies involving aphids and lizards.
 Isabel Parra, independent artist, Santiago, Chile; President, Violeta Parra Foundation, Santiago: An anthology of exile.
 Ana Irene Pizarro Romero, Professor of Latin American Literature and Cultural Studies, University of Santiago, Chile: Cultural design in the Amazon.
 Santiago Porter, photographer, Buenos Aires; Staff Photographer, Clarín: Photography.
 Ricardo Pozas Horcasitas, Research Professor, Institute of Social Research, National Autonomous University of Mexico (UNAM): The Sixties in Latin America.
 José Manuel Prieto, writer, Mexico City; Research Professor, Center for Economic Research and Teaching, Mexico City: Fiction.
 Hernán Quintana, Professor of Astronomy and Astrophysics, Pontifical Catholic University of Chile: Surveys of the large-scale structure of the universe.
 Walter Stephan Riedweg, artist, Rio de Janeiro: Collaborative interdisciplinary public art (in collaboration with Mauricio de Mello Dias).
 Eduardo Rivera López, Associate Professor of Philosophy, Universidad Torcuato di Tella, Buenos Aires; Researcher, National Research Council of Argentina (CONICET): Ethical issues in genetics and reproductive decisions.
 Juan Pablo Rossetti, Assistant Professor of Mathematics, National University of Córdoba: Classification of lattices.
 Marcelo Rubinstein, independent researcher, National Research Council of Argentina (CONICET): The role of central dopamine D2 receptors in mice carrying targeted conditional mutations.
 Juan Carlos Rulfo, film maker, Mexico City; Administrative and Creative Manager, La Media Productions, Mexico City: Film making.
 Vera Sala, Choreographer, São Paulo; Professor of Communication and Arts of the Body, Pontifical Catholic University of São Paulo: Choreography.
 Graciela Speranza, Professor of Argentine Literature, University of Buenos Aires: Argentine literature and the visual arts.
 Daniel Mario Ugarte, coordinator, Electron Microscopy Facility, National Synchrotron Light Laboratory (LNLS), Campinas, Brazil: Characterization and manipulation of nanosystems.
 André Vilaron, photographer, Rio de Janeiro: Photography.
 Helen Marie Zout, photographer, Buenos Aires, Argentina: Photography.

See also
Guggenheim Fellowship

References

External links
John Simon Guggenheim Memorial Foundation

2002
2002 awards
2002 art awards